Berlin is the capital and largest city of Germany.

Berlin may also refer to:

Places

Canada 
 Berlin, former name of Kitchener, Ontario
 Berlin to Kitchener name change (1916)

Germany 
 East Berlin, former de facto capital of the German Democratic Republic, 1949–90
 West Berlin, former western enclave of Berlin during the Cold War, 1949–90
 Berlin, district of Klein Bennebek, Schleswig-Holstein
 Berlin (Seedorf), district of Seedorf, Schleswig-Holstein

United States 
 Berlin, Alabama, town
 Berlin, California, former name of Genevra, California, unincorporated community
 Berlin, Connecticut, town
 Berlin, Georgia, town
 Berlin, Illinois, village
 Berlin, Indiana, former town
 Berlin, Kansas, unincorporated community
 Berlin, Kentucky, unincorporated community
 Berlin, Maryland, town
 Berlin, Massachusetts, town
 Berlin, Michigan (disambiguation), multiple locations in Michigan
 Berlin, Nebraska, a former name of Otoe, Nebraska, village
 Berlin, Nevada, ghost town
 Berlin, New Hampshire, city
 Berlin, New Jersey, township
 Berlin, New York, town
 Berlin, North Dakota, city
 Berlin, Ohio (disambiguation), multiple locations in Ohio
 Berlin, Pennsylvania, borough 
 Berlin, Tennessee, unincorporated community
 Berlin, Texas, unincorporated community
 Berlin, Vermont, town
 Berlin, West Virginia, unincorporated community
 Berlin, Wisconsin (disambiguation), multiple municipalities in Wisconsin
 Berlin Historic District (disambiguation), multiple places with the name
 Berlin Township (disambiguation), multiple townships

Rest of the world 
 Berlín, Usulután, El Salvador
 Berlin, Chelyabinsk Oblast, Russia
 Berlin, Eastern Cape, South Africa
 Mount Berlin, a mountain in Marie Byrd Land, Antarctica

People 
 Berlin (surname)
 Berlin, former stage name for professional wrestler Alex Wright
 Berlin Ndebe-Nlome (born 1987), Cameroonian football player
 Bertie "Berlin" Marshall, member of early UK punk fan faction the Bromley Contingent, later an author
 The Berlin Painter (active ), conventional name given to an Attic Greek vase-painter

Arts, entertainment, and media

Film and television 
 "Berlin" (The Blacklist), a 2014 episode
 Berlin (TV series), a 2009 BBC/Open University documentary series written and presented by Matt Frei
 Berlin (Money Heist), a character in the television series
 Berlin 36, 2009 German film on the fate of Jewish athlete Gretel Bergmann at the 1936 Olympics
 Berlin Station (TV series), an American drama television series
 Berlin: Symphony of a Metropolis, a 1927 German film

Literature 
 Berlin (play), a 2009 play by David Hare
 The Berlin Noir trilogy, three novels by Philip Kerr
 The Berlin Stories, two novellas by Christopher Isherwood

Music

Groups 
 Berlin (band), American new wave band
 James Freud and Berlin, Australian new wave band

Albums and EPs 
 Berlin (Art Zoyd album), 1987
 Berlin (EP), 2013 EP by RY X
 Berlin (Kadavar album), 2015
 Berlin (Lou Reed album), 1973
 Berlin - A Concert for the People, a 1982 live album by Barclay James Harvest
 Berlin Trilogy, three albums by David Bowie
 The Berlin Tapes (album), also released as Berlin, by Icehouse, 1995

Songs 
 "Berlin" (Lou Reed song), title track from the 1973 album
 "Berlin", by Black Rebel Motorcycle Club from the 2007 album Baby 81
 "Berlin", by Udo Lindenberg, 1981
 "Berlin", by Marillion from the 1989 album Seasons End
 "Berlin", by Nina Hagen from the 1993 album Revolution Ballroom
 "Berlin", by Janis Ian from the 1995 album Revenge
 "Berlin", by Amanda Palmer & the Grand Theft Orchestra from the album Theatre Is Evil
 "Berlin", by RY X from his EP Berlin
 "Berlin", by Snow Patrol from the 2011 album Fallen Empires
 "Berlin" (Tokio Hotel song), featuring VVAVES
"Berlín", by Aitana

Other 
 Berlin (comic), series of comic books by Jason Lutes depicting life in Berlin from 1928 to 1933
 Berlin (musical), a musical written by Erik Orton 
 Berlin (sculpture), a 1987 piece of art in west Berlin
 Berlin '85, board game
 Berlin Defence (disambiguation), in chess

Computing and technology 
 .berlin, a top level domain
 FuG 224 Berlin A, airborne radar system of World War II
 FuG 240 Berlin, airborne radar system of late World War II

Transportation

Air
 Berlin Airport (disambiguation), multiple airports with the name

Rail
 Berlin Station (disambiguation), multiple stations with the name
 Berlin, former name of station Liège (Paris Métro), Paris, France
 Berlin, former LIRR station on the Atlantic Branch, Richmond Hill, Queens, New York
 Berlin, former name of Dunton station at Van Wyck Avenue, 1871–76
 Berlín, a Medellín Metro station
 Berlin Junction, former LIRR station on the Atlantic Branch, Richmond Hill, Queens, New York

Ships
 Berlin A1411, lead ship of thes of the German Navy
 MS Berlin, an ocean liner built in 1924 as MS Gripsholm
 , cruiser of the Imperial German Navy built in 1902
 SS Berlin, multiple ships with the name
 , a British passenger steamship of 1875
 Birlinn or Berlin, a type of Scottish longship

Other
 Berlin (carriage), a type of coach or chariot
 IWL SR 59 Berlin, an East German motor scooter

Other uses 
 Berliner (doughnut), a pastry known in Chile as berlín
 Berlin Mills Company, a former company of Berlin, New Hampshire
 Berlin Raceway, a paved, oval track in Marne, Michigan
 Berlin wool work, a type of embroidery on canvas

See also 
 Berlin-Brandenburg (disambiguation)
 Berolina, personification of the city of Berlin
 Berliner (disambiguation)
 Berlino, mascot for the 2009 World Championships in athletics
 East Berlin (disambiguation)
 List of songs about Berlin
 New Berlin (disambiguation)
 West Berlin (disambiguation)